Valentine Goby (born 1974 in Grasse) is a French writer.

Biography 
After studying at Sciences Po, Valentine Goby lived three years in Asia, in Hanoi and in Manila, where she worked for humanitarian associations with street children. She started her professional career at Accenture where she worked in Human Resources from 1999 to 2001. She never stopped writing, and published her first novel in 2002 at Éditions Gallimard: La Note sensible. She became a teacher of literature and theater, a profession she worked in college for eight years before devoting herself entirely to writing, and to numerous projects around books: workshops, meetings, conferences, writing residencies in the middle school, media library, university. She is currently a lecturer at Sciences Po in literature and writing workshops, literary consultant for the book festival of Metz 2017, and columnist for the newspaper La Croix from September 2016 to January 2017. In addition to her 13 publications in general literature, she writes an important work for the youth.

She has since received numerous awards for each of her novels, in general literature and in youth literature.

She was awarded the 2014 prix des libraires 2014 for her novel  published at Actes Sud. The same novel received the literary prize of high school students of Ile-de-France awarded on 20 March 2015 during the Book Fair as well as 10 other awards. It has been translated or is being translated into six languages in addition to French.

Valentine Goby has been President of the Permanent Council of Writers since 2014 and Vice-President of The Charter of Youth Authors and Illustrators. She is Knight of Arts and Letters.

Works 
 La Note sensible, Gallimard, 2002  ; Folio, 2004 
 Sept jours, Gallimard, 2003 ;  ; Folio, 2016
 L'Antilope blanche, Gallimard, 2005  ; Feryane, 2006  ; Folio, 2007 
 Manuelo de la Plaine, Gallimard Jeunesse, coll. Folio junior, 2007 
 Petit éloge des grandes villes, Gallimard, coll. Folio 2 euros, 2007 
 L'Échappée, Gallimard, 2007  ; Folio, 2008, Prix Ouest 2008
 Le Rêve de Jacek, de la Pologne aux Corons du Nord, Autrement Jeunesse, 2007 ; Casterman poche, 2015
 Le Cahier de Leila, de l'Algérie à Billancourt, Autrement Jeunesse, 2007 ; Casterman poche, 2015
 Adama ou la vie en 3D, du Mali à Saint-Denis, Autrement Jeunesse, 2008 ; Casterman poche, 2015 
 Le Secret d'Angelica, de l'Italie aux fermes du Sud-ouest, Autrement Jeunesse, 2008
 Qui touche à mon corps je le tue, Gallimard, 2008 ; Folio, 2010
 Thiên An ou la grande traversée, du Viêtnam à Paris XIII, Autrement Jeunesse, 2009 ; Casterman poche, 2015
 Chaïma et les secrets d'Hassan, du Maroc à Marseille, Autrement Jeunesse, 2009 
 Anouche ou la fin de l'errance, de l'Arménie à la Vallée du Rhône, Autrement Jeunesse, 2010 
 João ou l'année des révolutions, du Portugal à Champigny, Autrement Jeunesse, 2010 
 Méduses, Jérôme Millon, 2010 ; Folio, 2011
 Antonio ou la Résistance, de l'Espagne à la région Toulousaine, Autrement Jeunesse, 2011
 Banquises, Albin Michel, 2011 ; Livre de poche, 2013
 Lyuba ou la tête dans les étoiles, de la Roumanie à l'Île de France, Autrement Jeunesse, 2012 
 Le Voyage immobile, Actes Sud Junior, 2012
 Le Mystère de Hawa'a, Albin Michel Jeunesse, 2013 (album)
 La Porte rouge, 2013, Thierry Magnier, (series "Photoroman")
 Une preuve d'amour, 2013 (roman jeunesse)
 Kinderzimmer, Actes Sud, 2013  ; coll. Babel, 2015, Prix des libraires 2014; Autres prix 2014 : Prix Libraires en Seine  - Prix des lecteurs du Maine Libre - Prix SOS libraires -  - Prix littéraire de l'Académie de Bretagne et des Pays de Loire - Prix coup de cœur des lecteurs, Salon du livre d'histoire de Blois -  - Prix Jean Monnet des Jeunes Européens - Prix des lycéens et apprentis d'Ile de France - Prix des Lycéens de Gujan Mestras - Prix des lycéens et apprentis de la région PACA
 Les Deux Vies de Ning. De la Chine à Paris-Belleville, illustrated by Philippe de Kemmeter, Autrement Jeunesse, 2013 
 La Fille surexposée, Alma Editeur (series "Pabloïd"), 2014 
 Baumes, Actes Sud, 2014 (series "Essences") 
 Le Grand Mensonge de la famille Pommerol, Thierry Magnier, 2015 (series "En voiture Simone !")
 Juliette Pommerol chez les Angliches, Thierry Magnier, 2016 (series "En voiture Simone ! ")
 Le Sorcier vert, Thierry Magnier, 2016 series "Les décadrés") album
 Tous Français d'ailleurs !, Casterman, 2016, Grands format jeunesse (compilation of 6 novels of the series "Français d'ailleurs")
 Un paquebot dans les arbres, Actes Sud, 2016 - Prix du roman de L'Hebdo 2016, Roman français de l'année 2016 du journal Le Parisien

 Prizes 
 2003: Prix premier roman de Culture et bibliothèques pour tous de la Sarthe for La note sensible.

 References   

 External links 
 Valentine Goby on Babelio
 Valentine Goby on Actes Sud
 Un paquebot dans les arbres on Actes Sud
 Valentine Goby on Maison des écrivains et des livres
 Valentine Goby on Ricochet-jeunes
 Valentine Goby on les Inrockuptibles''
 Valentine Goby - Kinderzimmer on YouTube

Sciences Po alumni
21st-century French non-fiction writers
French children's writers
French women children's writers
Prix des libraires winners
Chevaliers of the Ordre des Arts et des Lettres
1974 births
People from Grasse
Living people
21st-century French women writers